Ministry of Energy and Industry may refer to:

Ministry of Energy and Industry (Albania)
Ministry of Energy and Industry (Qatar)
Ministry of Energy, Industry and Mineral Resources, Saudi Arabia

See also
Ministry of Energy, Manpower and Industry (Brunei)
Ministry of Industry, Energy and Tourism (Iceland)
Ministry of Trade, Industry and Energy (South Korea)